KBBR (1340 AM) is a radio station broadcasting a progressive talk format. Licensed to North Bend, Oregon, United States.  The station is currently owned by Bicoastal Media, the broadcast license is held by Bicoastal Media Licenses III, LLC, and features programming from ABC Radio, Jones Radio Network and Westwood One.

References

External links
FCC History Cards for KBBR

BBR
News and talk radio stations in the United States
North Bend, Oregon
Radio stations established in 1948
1948 establishments in Oregon
Progressive talk radio